...och stora havet ("...and the Great Ocean") is the debut studio album by Swedish pop singer Jakob Hellman. It was released on February 13, 1989 by EMI.

Overview 
The album was recorded in 1988 in EMI's studio in Skärmarbrink, Stockholm, and was produced by Dan Sundquist. During the recording, Sundquist worked in parallel on an album by Freda', which had higher priority than the low-budget Hellman album. Sundquist and Hellman also had differing ideas about the sound of the album. Hellman wished to retain the more primitive feel of the 1987 demo that served as the basis of the record, while Sundquist was aiming for more of a pure pop production. Sundquist eventually got what he wanted.

...och stora havet was initially pressed in an edition of 5,000 copies. Once the song "Vara vänner" became a hit, the album was certified gold in the summer of 1989. The album was followed by a tour where Hellman was accompanied by musicians from Eldkvarn,  and Wilmer X.

Lyrically, the album is tinged with a longing to get away. The songs also capture a sense of being young, impatient, misunderstood, and angst-ridden.

The album was released in a remastered edition on CD on June 17, 1998. Nöjesguiden named ...och stora havet the best Swedish album of the century. It is also among the titles in the book Tusen svenska klassiker ("A Thousand Swedish Classics", 2009).

Track listing 

Notes
 This song is not listed on the back of the album.

Personnel 
 Jakob Hellman – vocals, guitar, electric guitar, piano, organ, arrangements and production

Additional personnel 
 Anders Sjögren – tuba
 Dan Sundquist – production, synthesizer, electric piano, minimoog, keyboard, bass, tambourine, backing vocals, wind arrangement, effects and programming
 Dave Castle – clarinet
 Eddie Sjöberg – guitar and mandolin
 Ingemar Dunker – drums
 Jan Zachrisson – keyboards, recording, production and programming on "Tango i Nizza"
 Jesper Lindberg – electric guitar and mandolin
 Kofi Bentsi-Enchill – bass
 Magnus Adell – bass and double bass
 Magnus Lind – accordion and piano
 Magnus Persson – tambourine, xylophone, percussion and triangle
 Mats Bengtsson – piano, accordion
 Mats Borg – drums
 Mats Olausson – piano and organ
 Matts Alsberg – bass and double bass
 Michael Jildestad – trombone
 Pelle Sirén – guitar
 Per Hägglund – synthesizer and effects
 Per Persson – vocals
 Sanken Sandquist – drums
 Titiyo Jah – backing vocals
 Werner Modiggård – drums
 Magnus Nygren – executive producer
 Alar Suurna – mixing

Notes
 Refers to the remastered edition.

Charts

Certificates

References

Notes

Print sources

External links 
 Information from Svensk mediedatabas

EMI Records albums
1989 debut albums
Jakob Hellman albums
Swedish-language albums